Anindita Ghose is an Indian author, journalist and editor based in Mumbai. Her debut novel The Illuminated was first published in the Indian subcontinent by 4th Estate Harper Collins and by Head of Zeus (Bloomsbury) internationally in 2023.   It was described by Call Me By Your Name author André Aciman as ‘extraordinary’  and Peony Hirwani of The Independent picked Ghose as one of her nine best upcoming authors from India. 

Ghose graduated from Columbia University's Graduate School of Journalism and began her career as a journalist at The Times of India. She later joined the editorial staff at Mint and then Vogue India, where she covered stories on art, books, and culture and living, before going on to edit the Saturday magazine, Mint Lounge. She lives in Madh Island, a fishing village along the Mumbai coastline.  

Her journalism has been published in The Guardian, The Caravan, The Hindu,  Vogue, and Kinfolk  among other places. In 2019, she attended the Hawthornden Literary Retreat, a 16th century medieval castle in the Scottish countryside, and believes the experience to have been "transformative".

Bibliography 

First Proof: The Penguin Book of New Writing from India 6 (anthology), India, Penguin, October 2010, 
The Illuminated, India, 4th Estate HarperCollins, July 2021, 
The Book of Dog (anthology), India, HarperCollins, January 2022, ISBN 978-9354893568
The Illuminated, United Kingdom, Head of Zeus, January 2023,

References

External links
Interview with Jonathan Franzen (video), March 2022, Jaipur Literature Festival
In conversation with Shunali Bhullar Shroff (video), March 2022, Jaipur Literature Festival
In conversation with Nilanjana Roy (video), August 2021, Asia Society

Living people
Columbia University Graduate School of Journalism alumni
Year of birth missing (living people)
Indian women writers
Indian women novelists
English-language writers from India